Paul Ovidiu Pîrvulescu (born 11 August 1988) is a Romanian professional footballer who plays as a left back or a left winger for Liga II side FK Csíkszereda.

Club career

Steaua București
On 4 January 2012 Steaua București signed Pîrvulescu from fellow Liga I club Gaz Metan Mediaș. Soon after the player penned a five-year contract to keep him at the club until the summer of 2016.

On 23 June 2017, Pîrvulescu signed a one-year contract with Polish club Wisła Płock. On 18 July 2018, he returned to the Romanian Liga I and signed a short contract with FC Politehnica Iași.

Career statistics

Club

Honours
Steaua București:
Liga I: 2012–13, 2013–14
Romanian Supercup: 2013

References

External links
 
 
 

1988 births
People from Mediaș
Living people
Romanian footballers
Association football defenders
Liga I players
CS Gaz Metan Mediaș players
FC Steaua București players
FC Viitorul Constanța players
FC Voluntari players
FC Politehnica Iași (2010) players
Austrian Football Bundesliga players
SKN St. Pölten players
Ekstraklasa players
Wisła Płock players
Liga II players
LPS HD Clinceni players
FC Universitatea Cluj players
FK Csíkszereda Miercurea Ciuc players
Romania under-21 international footballers
Romanian expatriate footballers
Romanian expatriate sportspeople in Austria
Expatriate footballers in Austria
Romanian expatriate sportspeople in Poland
Expatriate footballers in Poland